Gilkison's Corner was a small hamlet located in Montgomery County, Pennsylvania, in the United States. The community was in Upper Dublin Township, at the intersection of Butler Pike and Bethlehem Pike.

The term is primarily archaic in usage, and the location does not appear on modern maps.  Usage of the term appears to have declined towards the end of the 19th century, around the time of the establishment of the more heavily populated Borough of Ambler, whose eastern border is located along Bethlehem Pike.

Located at the intersection of two heavily travelled early roads, Gilkison's Corner was the location of a Revolutionary War-era tavern.  A large tannery was established just south of Gilkison's Corner in the 1850s, and Upper Dublin's post office was located in Gilkison's Corner until 1827.

Bean's 1884 History of Montgomery County, Pennsylvania describes Gilkison's Corner as follows:

References

Unincorporated communities in Pennsylvania
Upper Dublin Township, Montgomery County, Pennsylvania
Geography of Montgomery County, Pennsylvania